Cockrell Township is a township in Chariton County, in the U.S. state of Missouri. It was most likely named for Francis Marion Cockrell, a state legislator.

References

Townships in Missouri
Townships in Chariton County, Missouri